Caretaker may refer to:

Arts, entertainment, and media
 The Caretaker (film), a 1963 adaptation of the play The Caretaker
 The Caretakers, a 1963 American film set in a mental hospital
 Caretaker, a character in the 1974 film The Longest Yard
 Caretaker (comics), a Marvel Comics character who appeared in Ghost Rider
 The Caretaker Trilogy, series of science-fiction books for young adults by David Klass
 Caretaker (band), an English rock band
 The Caretaker (musician) (born 1974), project of electronic musician Leyland Kirby
 The Caretaker, a 1960 play by Harold Pinter
 "The Caretaker" (Doctor Who), a 2014 episode of Doctor Who
 "Caretaker" (Star Trek: Voyager), the pilot episode of Star Trek: Voyager

Personal roles
 Janitor (chiefly in the United States), a person who cleans and maintains buildings such as hospitals and schools
 Property caretaker, a person who cares for a property
 Caregiver or carer (UK), a person who cares for another person
 Caretaker manager, someone who takes temporary charge of team affairs of a football club

Other uses
 Caretaker government, a temporary government
 Caretaker Ministry (disambiguation), one of three short-lived governments of Great Britain 
 Caretaker genes, a group of tumour suppressor genes
 Caretaker (military), a detachment of one or more personnel to maintain facilities that are inactive but not abandoned

See also
Caretakers Cottage, an Australian organisation which assists homeless kids